Elys was an unincorporated community and coal town in Knox County, Kentucky, United States. It was also known as Hujel also a defunct coal town.

References

Unincorporated communities in Knox County, Kentucky
Unincorporated communities in Kentucky
Coal towns in Kentucky